Karma's World is a computer-animated musical comedy streaming television series created by rapper Chris "Ludacris" Bridges, who also co-starred in the show. It was released on Netflix on October 15, 2021.

Produced by 9 Story Media Group in Canada and Brown Bag Films in Ireland, and animated by its Bali studio subsidiary, the series is loosely based on an educational website of the same name created in 2009 by Karma’s World Entertainment, a consortium created by Ludacris specifically for his eldest daughter, Karma Bridges, whose name and inspiration he cited in interviews as the core reason behind his creation of the series. Netflix renewed Karma's World for a second season, which was released on March 10, 2022. Season 3 was released on July 7, 2022. Season 4 was released on September 22, 2022.

Premise
The series follows the story of Karma Grant, a young girl who begins middle school and learns that through her music she can stay "true to herself" instead of letting challenges push her down.

Characters

Main
 Karma Grant (Asiahn): The series' main 10-year-old female protagonist. She is an aspiring rapper who is beginning to realize the power that music and words can have, and believes that she can share her music and even change the world.
 Conrad Grant (Ludacris): The father of Karma who inspires her when she is down, and even raps on stage with her. He is a music teacher.
 Keys Grant (Camden Coley): The younger brother of Karma. He is an inventor, but his gadgets do not work well on the first try.
 Crash Watkins (Ramone Hamilton): Karma's classmate and also her frenemy. He and Karma might not get along everyday, but they still have a lot in common.
 Alex "Switch" Stein (vocals by Aria Capria and beat-box vocals by Kaila Mullady): The female best friend of Karma and Winston who is thoughtful and friendly. She is a gifted violinist and beatboxer.
 Winston Torres (Isaia Alvarez Kohn): The male best friend of Karma and Switch. He is a sneaker designer, an artist, and a videographer.
 Ms. Camilla Torres (Dascha Polanco): The mother of Winston. She owns a record shop.
 Lady K (Tiffany Haddish): The head of a recording studio where Karma began working.
 Lillie Carter-Grant (Danielle Brooks): The mother of Karma advises her daughter and lets her know about hair styles of their black women ancestors. She is a doctor.

Supporting
 Megan Zhang (Olivia Chun): Karma's friend who goes to one of her sleepovers.
 Sabiya Abdullah (Swayam Bhatia): Another of Karma's friends who comes to a sleepover.
 MC Grillz (Jordan Fisher): A famous rapper who is the host of "Freestyle Knockout", a popular rapping competition, and is a dentist.
 Ms. Jackie Washington (Dawnn Lewis): The Neighborhood Council President of Hansberry Heights. Her nickname is Ms. Dubs.
 Chris Douglas (Ares Totolos): Crash's best friend.
 Chef Scott Crowley (Marc Thompson): The owner of the Duet Diner. Karma, Winston, Switch, and Keys are his favorite customers. His diner's most popular item is purple scones.
 Mr. Mervin Crawford (Dean Irby): The neighborhood grump. He loves playing chess.
 Mr. Rishi Singal (Karan Soni): Karma, Winston, and Switch's middle school teacher.
 Doña Maria Torres (Ivonne Coll): Camilla's mother and Winston's grandmother. She is confined to a wheelchair due to having a stroke.
 Cece Dupree (Keke Palmer): A conniving rapper who does whatever she can to achieve her goals, even if other people are pulled down in the process.

Episodes

Series overview

Season 1 (2021)

Season 2 (2022)

Season 3 (2022)

Season 4 (2022)

Production
The series is produced by the Bali studio subsidiary of Brown Bag Films and Creative Affairs Group, both subsidiaries of 9 Story Media Group, and Karma's World Entertainment, Ludacris' consortium/production company. Apart from Ludacris, Vince Commisso, Cathal Gaffney, Wendy Harris, Darragh O'Connell, Angela C. Santomero, Jennie Stacey are also executive producers for the series, while Danielle Gillis, Lorraine Morgan, and Lisa O'Connor are producers. They are joined by Bronagh O'Hanlon as the show director and Elaine A. Lugo Herrera as art director. Additionally, the show's head writer is Halcyon Person.

On October 13, 2020, Netflix announced the green-lighting of the series with a 40-episode order, each of which would be 11 minutes long. The series was targeted at children who are 6–9 years old. Ludacris also claimed that the show would "move hip hop culture forward" by showing young girls they can change the world with the tools at their disposal.

On June 14, 2021, a sneak peek of the series was shown at the Annecy International Animation Film Festival. At the festival, Ludacris said he hoped that the show would be something that has a "a long-lasting impression" on  children. Person, on the same panel, argued that the show, set in a fictional neighborhood of Brooklyn, New York, said that the series includes a diversity of "hair texture and diversity of skin tones" in order to make sure all kinds of characters are celebrated, and argued that the series "models great behavior" for children.

The official trailer for the series was released on September 23, 2021.

The show's first episode premiered on YouTube on October 4, 2021.

The show's first season premiered on 15 October 2021. All 15 episodes of the season premiered on the same day and that day, the series premiered on Netflix across the world. Before the show's premiere, Ludacris said that the show was inspired by his eldest daughter, Karma. He also said that he tried to "make every single character unique" and hoped that his daughter would be able to guest star on the show in the future. He additionally said that having positive roles and "different ethnicities" he tool from the Fast & Furious franchise.

On November 5, 2021, Ludacris told Billboard that the show had been "close to 14 years in the making" and hoped that would be a show for everyone, kids and adults. He said that he believed the series would change "young people’s lives for the better."

On November 8, 2021, Person told Essence about how with Karma they tried to celebrate her hairstyle and everyone's, working "really hard to try and get right" in order to have "authentic storytelling." She also noted that she and writers she worked with collaborated to address microaggressions, working with an organization named the Perception Institute, which analyzes people's perceptions as they're watching media. She also praised Netflix for giving them the opportunity to tell these stories about Black culture.

On March 10, 2022, the show's second season premiered on Netflix. All eight episodes premiered the same day.

On July 7, 2022, the show's third season premiered on July 7, 2022. All nine episodes premiered on the same day.

On September 22, 2022, the show's fourth season premiered on September 22, 2022. All eight episodes premiered on the same day.

In December 2022, Darnell Lamont Walker, writer for the Season 3 episode "Friendship In a Flash", was interviewed by BET, said that working on the series was "incredible", that it was his "first real job as a children’s writer", and noted that episodes like the one he wrote were "important", especially for those with dyslexia. Walker had joined the show's writing team in 2019, and later said that the episode aired over two years after he wrote it. He was later nominated, along with the show's writing team, for Outstanding Writing for an Animated Program at the 1st Children's and Family Emmy Awards.

Music
The show's original music and sound design are supervised and created by Ludacris and James Bennett Jr., while Gerald Keys is a producer. Songs tackle issues such as discrimination, body positivity, self-esteem, friendship, family, and differences. The show's theme song, "Welcome to Karma’s World", is sung by Asiahn, the voice actress for Karma.

On September 14, 2021, Ludacris unveiled the show's soundtrack, which was released by Universal Music Group through its Def Jam label on the same date as the show's Netflix premiere.

Merchandise

Books
In March 2021, 9 Story Media Group and Karma's World Entertainment started a deal with Scholastic Corporation, with the books planned to be released between January and March 2022 to accompany the Netflix series. All three books were co-written by Person. In an October 2021 interview, Ludacris noted that a Karma's World entitled Daddy and Me and the Rhyme to Be was coming out. Apart from the aforementioned book, currently the juvenile fiction books The Great Shine-A-Thon Showcase, and Viral Video Showdown, and journal Karma's World Creativity Journal: Freestyling With Friends are listed on the Scholastic website.

Toys
In April 2021, 9 Story and Karma's World Entertainment signed a deal with Mattel to develop a toy line for the franchise, including dolls, "doll accessories," and other elements. In March 2022, it was announced that the dolls would be released in the summer of 2022.

Clothing
In February 2022, FIT's Design and Technology Lab (DTech) announced a deal with Karma's World Entertainment and 9 Story to create a 50-piece fashion set for children which was inspired by the series, including dresses, jackets, and footwear. 9 Story called it a "unique partnership." Essence called it a "fashion-forward" collection, while one of the designers, Hawwaa Ibrahim, said they were grateful for the opportunity to apply their skills.

Other merchandise
9 Story and Karma's World Entertainment have announced planned expansions of the franchise beyond books, toys, and clothing. In November 2021, 9 Story noted that the franchise would be expanded to bags, backpacks, consumer electronics, skateboards, and other materials.

Reception
The series has been received positively. Joly Herman of Common Sense Media described the series as "top-shelf", saying that it has "creative, fully fleshed-out characters" and has the characters artfully face "heartfelt, complex issues." Herman also argued that the series is "full of empowering moments" and said that it uses art to "inspire, empower, and elevate through storytelling," calling it an excellent series for "young tweens." Claretta Bellamy  of NBC News stated that the show's second season tackles challenges such as personal space and body shaming in a way that "both entertains and allows for kids to comprehend."

Awards and nominations

References

External links

 
 
 

2021 American television series debuts
2020s American animated television series
2020s American black cartoons
2020s American school television series
2021 Canadian television series debuts
2020s Canadian animated television series
2020s Canadian black cartoons
American children's animated comedy television series
American children's animated musical television series
American computer-animated television series
Canadian children's animated comedy television series
Canadian children's animated musical television series
Canadian computer-animated television series
Animated television series about children
Animated television series about families
Animated television series about twins
Animated television series reboots
Middle school television series
English-language Netflix original programming
Television series by 9 Story Media Group
Television series by Brown Bag Films
Television series by Netflix Animation
Hip hop television